Michael E. Bauman (February 14, 1950 – October 2, 2019) was a Professor of Theology and Culture and Director of Christian Studies at Hillsdale College in Hillsdale, Michigan.  He was also a member of the faculty of Summit Ministries, in Manitou Springs, Colorado. He was for eight years Lecturer and Tutor in Renaissance Theology and Literature at the Centre for Medieval and Renaissance Studies, Oxford, where he also was Associate Dean of the Summer School.

Early life and education
Bauman was born on February 14, 1950, in Moline, Illinois, to Edward and Edith Bauman. He graduated from Moline High School and served his country in the United States Marine Corps Reserve. He had a Bachelor of Arts in Old Testament from Trinity College, now known as Trinity International University (1977), a Master of Arts in Church History from McCormick Theological Seminary (1979), and an interdisciplinary PhD in Theology, History, and Literature from Fordham University (1983).

Publications
Bauman wrote or edited more than 20 books and published more than 50 academic articles on topics spanning Theology, Politics, History and Literature,. He also wrote several popular articles on athletics, especially competitive cycling. He was a member of the editorial department of Newsweek magazine for 2½ years and a book review editor for the Journal of the Evangelical Theological Society for 12 years.

Some of his works included the following:
Long Walk Home: Life with My Two Fathers, God and Ed (2018)
Pilgrim Theology: Taking the Path of Theological Discovery (2007)
The Creed: Beliefs that Matter (2002)
Historians of the Christian Tradition with Martin Klauber (1995)
Are You Politically Correct?: Debating America's Cultural Standards with Francis J. Beckwith (1993)
Man and Marxism: Religion and the Communist Retreat with Lissa Roche (1991)
Roundtable: Conversations With European Theologians (1990)
'A Scripture Index to John Milton's De Doctrina Christiana (1989)
Milton's Arianism (1986)

Awards and honors
He was a two-time Staley Foundation Distinguished lecturer and a three-time Amy Foundation National Writing Award winner. He was a President of the Evangelical Philosophical Society.

References

External links
 Official Blog
 Michael Bauman Articles at The Imaginative Conservative
 Imprimis Article

American religion academics
1950 births
2019 deaths
People from Moline, Illinois
Military personnel from Illinois
Hillsdale College faculty
Fordham University alumni
Trinity International University alumni
American theologians
McCormick Theological Seminary alumni
Writers from Illinois